A rice cooker or rice steamer is an automated kitchen appliance designed to boil or steam rice. It consists of a heat source, a cooking bowl, and a thermostat. The thermostat measures the temperature of the cooking bowl and controls the heat. Complex, high-tech rice cookers may have more sensors and other components, and may be multipurpose.

Naming
The term rice cooker formerly applied to non-automated dedicated rice-cooking utensils, which have an ancient history (a ceramic rice steamer dated to 1250 BC is on display in the British Museum). It now applies mostly to automated cookers. Electric rice cookers were developed in Japan, where they are known as suihanki (炊飯器, literally, "boil-rice-device").

Principle of operation

A basic rice cooker has a main body (pot), an inner cooking container which holds the rice, an electric heating element, and a thermostat.

The bowl is filled with rice and water and heated at full power; the water reaches and stays at boiling point (100 °C, 212 °F). When the water has all been absorbed, the temperature can rise above boiling point, which trips the thermostat. Some cookers switch to low-power "warming" mode, keeping the rice at a safe temperature of approximately 65 °C (150 °F); simpler models switch off; the rice has entered the resting phase.

More advanced cookers may use fuzzy logic for more detailed temperature control, induction rather than resistive heating, a steaming tray for other foods, and even the ability to rinse the rice.

Rice types and rice cookers 

Brown rice generally needs longer cooking times than white rice, unless it is broken, or flourblasted (which perforates the bran).

Many models feature an ability to cook sticky rice or porridge as an added value. Most can be used as steamers. Some can be used as slow cookers. Some other models can bake bread or in some cases have an added function to maintain temperatures suitable for fermentation of bread dough or yogurt. Multi-purpose devices with rice cooking capability are not necessarily called "rice cookers", but typically "multi-cookers".

A rice cooker, or slow cooker, can be used in conjunction with a temperature probe and an external thermostat to cook food at a stable low temperature ("sous-vide").

History

Automatic electric rice cookers were first released in 1955 by the Japanese company Toshiba. In December 1956, the Toshiba Corporation placed the first commercially successful automated electric rice cookers on the market. Since then, millions have been sold worldwide. The rice cookers available today are not much different from the original models.

See also

 Rice polisher
 Slow cooker
 Remoska, small portable oven
 Vacuum flask
 Hot water dispenser
 List of cooking appliances
 List of Japanese cooking utensils

References

Further reading

Rice
Chinese food preparation utensils
Cooking appliances
Cooking vessels
Cookware and bakeware
East Asian food preparation utensils
Japanese food preparation utensils
Japanese inventions
Korean food preparation utensils